Blow Your Face Out is the second live album by American rock band The J. Geils Band, released in 1976.

Recording 
The album was recorded at two concerts held in November 1975. The first show was at the Boston Garden in the band's hometown (Boston, Massachusetts) on November 15, and recorded by Record Plant East Remote with David Hewitt.
The second was recorded by Metro Audio Detroit four nights later at Cobo Hall in Detroit, Michigan, the same city where the band's other two live albums "Live" Full House (1972) and Showtime! (1982) were also recorded.

Track listing

All songs written by Seth Justman and Peter Wolf, except where noted.

Side One
 "Southside Shuffle" – 4:16
 "Back to Get Ya" – 4:38
 "Shoot Your Shot" (Junior Walker, James Graves, Lawrence Horn) – 3:56
 "Musta Got Lost" – 6:34

Side Two
 "Where Did Our Love Go" (Brian Holland, Lamont Dozier, Eddie Holland Jr.) – 4:00
 "Truck Drivin' Man" (Terry Fell) – 1:52
 "Love-Itis" (Harvey Scales, Albert Vance) – 4:05
 "Lookin' for a Love" (J. W. Alexander, Zelda Samuels) – 2:06
 "Ain't Nothin' but a Houseparty" (Del Sharh, Joe Thomas) – 5:04

Side Three
 "So Sharp" (Arlester "Dyke" Christian) – 2:38
 "Detroit Breakdown" – 6:25
 "Chimes" – 8:56

Side Four
 "Sno-Cone" (Albert Collins) – 3:04
 "Wait" – 3:44
 "Raise Your Hand" (Steve Cropper, Eddie Floyd, Alvertis Isbell) – 4:08
 "Start All Over" – 2:21
 "Give It to Me" – 6:52

The track listing on the original release has several incorrect song titles. "Must of Got Lost" is listed as "Musta Got Lost", "Lookin' for a Love" as "Intro:", "Start All Over Again" as "Start All Over", and "Ain't Nothin' but a Houseparty" as "Houseparty". "Musta Got Lost" is possibly a simple error, but the other two are seemingly stylistic choices, as the label on the record notes the real titles of the songs in parentheses.

Personnel
Peter Wolf – vocals
J. Geils – guitar
Magic Dick – harmonica
Seth Justman – keyboards, vocals
Danny Klein – bass
Stephen Jo Bladd – drums, vocals

Charts

References 

The J. Geils Band albums
Albums produced by Bill Szymczyk
1976 live albums
Atlantic Records live albums
Albums recorded at the Boston Garden